The George Washington University Graduate School of Education and Human Development (abbreviated as GSEHD) is the professional graduate school of education of the George Washington University, in Washington, D.C. GSEHD is one of the most preeminent schools of education in the United States.

U.S. News & World Report ranks GSEHD as the 38th best school of education in the U.S. and as having the 6th best rehabilitation counseling program in the U.S.

GSEHD specializes in higher education, educational policy, counseling, teaching, and other educational programs. The Graduate School of Education and Human Development is now composed of five distinct academic departments.
The school offers doctoral, masters, and certificate programs.

History
Although teacher education has been offered since the university's founding in 1904, the School itself officially started in 1909.

Michael J. Feuer became the School's dean in 2010.

Academics 
Five departments make up the Graduate School of Education and Human Development, including Counseling & Human Development, Curriculum & Pedagogy, Educational Leadership, Human & Organizational Learning, and Special Education & Disability Studies.

GSEHD is one of the largest of the 14 colleges and schools within the George Washington University.

References

External links 
 GWU School of Education and Human Development
 The George Washington University

Colleges and Schools of The George Washington University
Schools of education in Washington, D.C.
Educational institutions established in 1909
1909 establishments in Washington, D.C.